Musa × alinsanaya is a Malesian tropical plant in the banana family (Musaceae), native to the Philippines. Only formally named in 2004, it is considered to be a hybrid between Musa banksii and Musa textilis. The flower bud is shiny green with purple inside. It produces small fruit with a high proportion of seeds.

Uses
Traditionally the plant fibers of the petiole and pseudostem are used in the making of various ropes and strings.

References

alinsanaya
Plant nothospecies
Plants described in 2004
Flora of the Philippines
Fiber plants